Bjorg Lambrecht (2 April 1997 – 5 August 2019) was a Belgian cyclist who rode for UCI WorldTeam . In August 2018, he was named in the startlist for the 2018 Vuelta a España. He died on 5 August 2019 after crashing into a concrete culvert during the third stage of the 2019 Tour de Pologne.

Early life and family
Lambrecht came from the Belgian town of Knesselare, situated between Bruges and Ghent. He was born to Kurt and Anje Lambrecht and had a sister, Britt.

Career
In 2015, Lambrecht became the Belgian national junior champion, relegating Glen Van Nuffelen and Stijn Goolaerts to second and third places respectively.

In 2016, he caused a surprise by winning the opening stage of the Ronde de l'Isard. In the final stage he was sent in the wrong direction by the race management. The race jury recognized the error and so Lambrecht became the third Belgian to win this race after Yannick Eijssen (2010) and Louis Vervaeke (2014). Just under two weeks after his final win in France, Lambrecht took part in the Grand Prix Priessnitz spa race with a Belgian selection. Here he managed to win the last leg, with a sloping finish on cobbles in Jeseník, with a lead of a few seconds.

At the beginning of 2017, he won Liège–Bastogne–Liège U23 race by beating his three fellow poursuivants in the sprint. Later that year he was fifth in the Flèche Ardennaise race, second in the final classification of the Ronde de l'Isard, eighth in that of the Tour of the Jura, he won a stage and the final classification in the Grand Prix Priessnitz spa and became second in the final classifications of the Tour de Savoie Mont-Blanc, the Giro della Valle d'Aosta and the Tour de l'Avenir 2017.

In 2019, he recorded his biggest result as a professional, finishing fourth at the Flèche Wallonne race.

Death
Lambrecht crashed into a concrete culvert during stage three of the 2019 Tour de Pologne. The cause of the crash is unknown, no other riders appeared to have been involved. He was taken to hospital in Rybnik by ambulance, but died during surgery. Out of respect for Lambrecht, the fourth stage of the race was neutralised, allowing riders to honour his memory. The remaining members of the Lotto-Soudal team led the peloton in the first part of the race until kilometre 48, where Lambrecht had crashed the previous day, at which point the peloton stopped and a moment of silence was held. On 7 August 2019, 's team doctor, Maarten Meirhaeghe, said in a press statement that Lambrecht's death was caused by "a severe laceration to his liver that caused an internal hemorrhage and a cardiac arrest".

Lambrecht was buried on 13 August 2019 in Saint Willibrord Church in his home town of Knesselare. Hundreds attended the service, including many former  teammates, some of whom carried the coffin into the church. On 11 August, a minute's silence was held before the 2019 European Road Championships in honour of Lambrecht. On 25 August, another minute's silence was held before Stage 2 of the Vuelta a España, the first Grand Tour that Lambrecht would have competed in.

Major results
The following are some of the major achievements of Lambrecht.

2015
 1st  Road race, National Junior Road Championships
 Driedaagse van Axel
1st  Mountains classification
1st Stage 4
 2nd Overall Oberösterreich Juniorenrundfahrt
1st  Mountains classification
 3rd Overall GP Général Patton
1st  Mountains classification
 3rd Overall Aubel–Thimister–La Gleize
 3rd Trofeo Emilio Paganessi
 3rd La Philippe Gilbert Juniors
 4th Overall Trofeo Karlsberg
2016
 1st  Overall Ronde de l'Isard
1st  Points classification
1st  Young rider classification
1st  Mountains classification
1st Stage 1
 2nd  Road race, UEC European Under-23 Road Championships
 3rd Piccolo Giro di Lombardia
 4th Flèche Ardennaise
 4th Overall Course de la Paix U23
1st Stage 3
 10th Overall Tour de Savoie Mont Blanc
 10th Overall Giro della Valle d'Aosta
2017
 1st  Overall Grand Prix Priessnitz spa
1st  Points classification
1st Stage 2
 1st Liège-Bastogne-Liège Espoirs
 2nd Overall Giro della Valle d'Aosta
1st  Points classification
 2nd Overall Ronde de l'Isard
1st Stage 3
 2nd Overall Tour de Savoie Mont Blanc
 2nd Overall Tour de l'Avenir
 5th Flèche Ardennaise
 8th Overall Tour du Jura
1st  Young rider classification
 10th Overall Circuit des Ardennes
2018
 2nd  Road race, UCI Road World Under-23 Championships
 2nd Overall Tour des Fjords
1st  Young rider classification
1st Stage 3
2019
 1st  Young rider classification, Critérium du Dauphiné
 4th La Flèche Wallonne
 5th Brabantse Pijl
 6th Amstel Gold Race

References

External links

1997 births
2019 deaths
Belgian male cyclists
Sportspeople from Ghent
Cyclists from East Flanders
Cyclists who died while racing
Sport deaths in Poland